A radio clock or radio-controlled clock (RCC), and often (incorrectly) referred to as an atomic clock is a type of quartz clock or watch that is automatically synchronized to a time code transmitted by a radio transmitter connected to a time standard such as an atomic clock. Such a clock may be synchronized to the time sent by a single transmitter, such as many national or regional time transmitters, or may use the multiple transmitters used by satellite navigation systems such as Global Positioning System. Such systems may be used to automatically set clocks or for any purpose where accurate time is needed. RC clocks may include any feature available for a clock, such as alarm function, display of ambient temperature and humidity, broadcast radio reception, etc.

One common style of radio-controlled clock uses time signals transmitted by dedicated terrestrial longwave radio transmitters, which emit a time code that can be demodulated and displayed by the radio controlled clock. The radio controlled clock will contain an accurate time base oscillator to maintain timekeeping if the radio signal is momentarily unavailable. Other radio controlled clocks use the time signals transmitted by dedicated transmitters in the shortwave bands. Systems using dedicated time signal stations can achieve accuracy of a few tens of milliseconds.

GPS satellite receivers also internally generate accurate time information from the satellite signals. Dedicated GPS timing receivers are accurate to better than 1 microsecond; however, general-purpose or consumer grade GPS may have an offset of up to one second between the internally calculated time, which is much more accurate than 1 second, and the time displayed on the screen.

Other broadcast services may include timekeeping information of varying accuracy within their signals.

Single transmitter
Radio clocks synchronized to a terrestrial time signal can usually achieve an accuracy within a hundredth of a second relative to the time standard, generally limited by uncertainties and variability in radio propagation. Some timekeepers, particularly watches such as some Casio Wave Ceptors which are more likely than desk clocks to be used when travelling, can synchronise to any one of several different time signals transmitted in different regions.

Longwave and shortwave transmissions
Radio clocks depend on coded time signals from radio stations. The stations vary in broadcast frequency, in geographic location, and in how the signal is modulated to identify the current time. In general, each station has its own format for the time code.

List of radio time signal stations 

Descriptions

Many other countries can receive these signals (JJY can sometimes be received in New Zealand, Western Australia, Tasmania, Southeast Asia, parts of Western Europe and the Pacific Northwest of North America at night), but success depends on the time of day, atmospheric conditions, and interference from intervening buildings. Reception is generally better if the clock is placed near a window facing the transmitter.

Clock receivers
A number of manufacturers and retailers sell radio clocks that receive coded time signals from a radio station, which, in turn, derives the time from a true atomic clock.

One of the first radio clocks was offered by Heathkit in late 1983. Their model GC-1000 "Most Accurate Clock" received shortwave time signals from radio station WWV in Fort Collins, Colorado. It automatically switched between WWV's 5, 10, and 15 MHz frequencies to find the strongest signal as conditions changed through the day and year. It kept time during periods of poor reception with a quartz-crystal oscillator. This oscillator was disciplined, meaning that the microprocessor-based clock used the highly accurate time signal received from WWV to trim the crystal oscillator. The timekeeping between updates was thus considerably more accurate than the crystal alone could have achieved. Time down to the tenth of a second was shown on an LED display. The GC-1000 originally sold for US$250 in kit form and US$400 preassembled, and was considered impressive at the time. Heath Company was granted a patent for its design.

In the 2000s (decade) radio-based "atomic clocks" became common in retail stores; as of 2010 prices start at around US$15 in many countries. Clocks may have other features such as indoor thermometers and weather station functionality. These use signals transmitted by the appropriate transmitter for the country in which they are to be used. Depending upon signal strength they may require placement in a location with a relatively unobstructed path to the transmitter and need fair to good atmospheric conditions to successfully update the time. Inexpensive clocks keep track of the time between updates, or in their absence, with a non-disciplined quartz-crystal clock, with the accuracy typical of non-radio-controlled quartz timepieces. Some clocks include indicators to alert users to possible inaccuracy when synchronization has not been recently successful.

The United States National Institute of Standards and Technology (NIST) has published guidelines recommending that radio clock movements keep time between synchronizations to within ±0.5 seconds to keep time correct when rounded to the nearest second. Some of these movements can keep time between synchronizations to within ±0.2 seconds by synchronizing more than once spread over a day.

Other broadcasts

 Attached to other broadcast stations Broadcast stations in many countries have carriers precisely synchronized to a standard phase and frequency, such as the BBC Radio 4 longwave service on 198 kHz, and some also transmit sub-audible or even inaudible time-code information, like the Radio France longwave transmitter on 162 kHz. Attached time signal systems generally use audible tones or phase modulation of the carrier wave.

 Teletext (TTX) Digital text pages embedded in television video also provide accurate time. Many modern TV sets and VCRs with TTX decoders can obtain accurate time from Teletext and set the internal clock. However the TTX time can vary up to 5 minutes.

Many digital radio and digital television schemes also include provisions for time-code transmission.

 Digital Terrestrial Television  The DVB and ATSC standards have 2 packet types that send time and date information to the receiver. Digital television systems can equal GPS stratum 2 accuracy (with short term clock discipline) and stratum 1 (with long term clock discipline) provided the transmitter site (or network) supports that level of functionality.

 VHF FM Radio Data System (RDS) RDS can send a clock signal with sub-second precision but with an accuracy no greater than 100 ms and with no indication of clock stratum. Not all RDS networks or stations using RDS send accurate time signals. The time stamp format for this technology is Modified Julian Date (MJD) plus UTC hours, UTC minutes and a local time offset.

 L-band and VHF Digital Audio Broadcasting  DAB systems provide a time signal that has a precision equal to or better than Digital Radio Mondiale (DRM) but like FM RDS do not indicate clock stratum. DAB systems can equal GPS stratum 2 accuracy (short term clock discipline) and stratum 1 (long term clock discipline) provided the transmitter site (or network) supports that level of functionality. The time stamp format for this technology is BCD.

 Digital Radio Mondiale (DRM) DRM is able to send a clock signal, but one not as precise as navigation satellite clock signals. DRM timestamps received via shortwave (or multiple hop mediumwave) can be up to 200 ms off due to path delay. The time stamp format for this technology is BCD.

Gallery

Multiple transmitters
A radio clock receiver may combine multiple time sources to improve its accuracy. This is what is done in satellite navigation systems such as the Global Positioning System. GPS, Galileo and GLONASS satellite navigation systems have one or more caesium, rubidium or hydrogen maser atomic clocks on each satellite, referenced to a clock or clocks on the ground. Dedicated timing receivers can serve as local time standards, with a precision better than 50 ns. The recent revival and enhancement of LORAN, a land-based radio navigation system, will provide another multiple source time distribution system.

GPS clocks

Many modern radio clocks use satellite navigation systems such as Global Positioning System to provide more accurate time than can be obtained from terrestrial radio stations. These GPS clocks combine time estimates from multiple satellite atomic clocks with error estimates maintained by a network of ground stations. Due to effects inherent in radio propagation and ionospheric spread and delay, GPS timing requires averaging of these phenomena over several periods. No GPS receiver directly computes time or frequency, rather they use GPS to discipline an oscillator that may range from a quartz crystal in a low-end navigation receiver, through oven-controlled crystal oscillators (OCXO) in specialized units, to atomic oscillators (rubidium) in some receivers used for synchronization in telecommunications. For this reason, these devices are technically referred to as GPS-disciplined oscillators.

GPS units intended primarily for time measurement as opposed to navigation can be set to assume the antenna position is fixed. In this mode, the device will average its position fixes. After approximately a day of operation, it will know its position to within a few meters. Once it has averaged its position, it can determine accurate time even if it can pick up signals from only one or two satellites. 

GPS clocks provide the precise time needed for synchrophasor measurement of voltage and current on the commercial power grid to determine the health of the system.

Astronomy timekeeping
Although any satellite navigation receiver that is performing its primary navigational function must have an internal time reference accurate to a small fraction of a second, the displayed time is often not as precise as the internal clock. Most inexpensive navigation receivers have one CPU that is multitasking. The highest-priority task for the CPU is maintaining satellite lock—not updating the display. Multicore CPUs for navigation systems can only be found on high end products.

For serious precision timekeeping, a more specialized GPS device is needed. Some amateur astronomers, most notably those who time grazing lunar occultation events when the moon blocks the light from stars and planets, require the highest precision available for persons working outside large research institutions. The Web site of the International Occultation Timing Association has detailed technical information about precision timekeeping for the amateur astronomer.

Daylight saving time
Various of the formats above include a flag indicating the status of daylight saving time (DST) in the home country of the transmitter. This signal is typically used by clocks to adjust the displayed time to meet user expectations.

See also
 Casio Wave Ceptor
 Clock network
 Speaking clock
 Standard frequency and time signal service
 Time from NPL
 Time transfer
 Time synchronization in North America

References

External links

 IOTA Observers Manual This manual from the International Occultation Timing Association has very extensive details on methods of accurate time measurement.
 NIST website: WWVB Radio Controlled Clocks
 NTP Project Development Website

Clocks
Watches
Clock